Full Circle is a studio album by Saga, their thirteenth album of new material. This recording marks the beginning of the second round of Chapters.

Track listing

The Chapters
Three of the songs, "Remember When (Chapter 9)", "Uncle Albert's Eyes (Chapter 13)" and "Not This Way (Chapter 10)," are part of the second series of eight songs that Saga included within some of their albums called "The Chapters," which told the story of a young Albert Einstein. These songs were later included on the 2005 live album The Chapters Live that was recorded in 2003.

Personnel
 Michael Sadler: Lead Vocals & Keyboards
 Jim Gilmour: Lead Keyboards & Vocals
 Ian Crichton: Lead Guitar & Acoustic
 Steve Negus: Drums & Percussion
 Jim Crichton: Bass, Keyboards & Acoustic Guitar

Production
 Jim Crichton: Production & Mixing
 Penny Crichton: Artwork

References

1999 albums
Saga (band) albums
SPV/Steamhammer albums